Stade du Thillenberg is a football stadium in Differdange, in south-western Luxembourg.  It is currently the home stadium of FC Differdange 03.  Until 2003, it was the home of Red Boys Differdange.  The stadium has a capacity of 7,150 people.

References
World Stadiums - Luxembourg
StadiumDB page

Thillenberg
Thillenberg